"Yo No Tengo Nah" ("I don't have nothing") is a Christmas song written and perform by Kany García. The song is part of effort to raising funds to benefit substantially Psychopedagogical Institute of Puerto Rico, a place that houses children and adults with severe mental retardation. "Yo No Tengo Nah", can only be obtained through digital download.

Song Information
"Yo No Tengo Nah" talks about the custom that Puerto Rican families have to spend the holidays away from the island and plans to spend the best and funniest Christmas in Puerto Rico. People can only get the song in any of the Church's Chicken restaurants, Chili's, Pollo Tropical and Romano's Macaroni Grill, by making a donation of $2.00 to benefit the institute.

Charts

Release history

References

2011 songs
Songs written by Kany García